Diktor may refer to:

 Diktor, a character in the 1941 Robert Heinlein short story "By His Bootstraps"
 Diktor TV, a character in the 1955 Soviet comedy film Behind Show Windows

See also
 Dikta, a fictional race of humans in Larry Niven's novel A World Out of Time